Marsteinen is a local Norwegian newspaper published in Austevoll in Hordaland county. 

Marsteinen was launched in 1978 and is issued once a week, on Thursdays. The newspaper's offices are located in Storebø. Trond Hagenes has served as the paper's editor since 2006. The newspaper was named after the Marstein Lighthouse, which stands in the northwest part of the municipality.

Circulation
According to the Norwegian Audit Bureau of Circulations and National Association of Local Newspapers, Marsteinen has had the following annual circulation:
2004: 2,373
2005: 2,468
2006: 2,286
2007: 2,402
2008: 2,307
2009: 2,344
2010: 2,365
2011: 2,368
2012: 2,367
2013: 2,349
2014: 2,329
2015: 2,261
2016: 2,162

References

External links
Marsteinen homepage

Newspapers published in Norway
Norwegian-language newspapers
Austevoll
Mass media in Hordaland
Publications established in 1978
1978 establishments in Norway